Michael Clark is a former American football coach  He served as the head football coach at Bridgewater College in Bridgewater, Virginia from 1995 to 2021, compiling a record of 166-103-1. While at Bridgewater, he has led a remarkable turnaround of a historically struggling program. In 2001, he led Bridgewater to the NCAA Division III National Championship game, which they narrowly lost to Mount Union, 30–27. Clark's 2001 Bridgewater team is the only Old Dominion Athletic Conference (ODAC) team to appear in the NCAA Division III National Championship title game. Clark retired after the spring season in 2021.

Clark played college football at the University of Cincinnati from 1976 to 1979.

Head coaching record

References

External links
 Bridgewater profile

Year of birth missing (living people)
Living people
Bridgewater Eagles football coaches
Cincinnati Bearcats football coaches
Cincinnati Bearcats football players
Murray State Racers football coaches
Virginia Tech Hokies football coaches
VMI Keydets football coaches
Players of American football from Youngstown, Ohio